A Thousand and One... Americas is a Spanish animated television series produced by BRB Internacional and Televisión Española to celebrate the 5th centenary of Christopher Columbus' voyage to America.

The series focuses on the adventures of Chris, a 10-year-old boy, and his yellowish dog Lon. Chris accidentally discovers an old book at the attic which belonged to his grandfather, which he brought with him from his journeys. The book makes him and his dog drift through imagination to historical occurrences of different nations which lived in America before it was found by Columbus in 1492.

The series has been dubbed and subtitled in English, Spanish, Serbian, Macedonian, Greek (dubbed only) and Hebrew.

The opening and ending songs of the Spanish version were performed by the famous group Mocedades, which reached 2nd place in 1973 Eurovision Song Contest.

Regional releases
No DVD or VHS releases has ever been made of the series, although the complete show is available (in Spanish) in BRB´s YouTube channel.

Structure
Each new adventure would begin with a more or less rhetorical question by Chris' brother. Chris, excited, would take his brother to the attic to search for the answer in their grandfather's book. A voice over would follow by Chris' grandfather describing the flora and fauna of the place the pre-Columbian culture inhabited, while on screen the mentioned beings were shown.

Before actually beginning the adventure, there would be a comical sequence of a predator trying to catch a prey, without success. Chris would arrive into a village of the culture, where after having to save someone's life, giving the excuse to have the characters present each other, some odd comment would be made about his dog. The oddest of which came from cultures that never knew of dogs.

Adventures would usually span several episodes, before starting a new one with a different culture.

Alternative titles
 Las mil y una... Americas (Spanish Title)
 A Thousand and One... Americas (English title)
 As mil e uma Américas (Portuguese title)
 אלף ואחת אמריקות (Elef VeAchat Amerikot) (Israeli Title)
 Com'è grande l'America (Italian Title)
 Hiljadu i jedna Amerika (Serbian Title)
 Χίλιες και μία Αμερικές (Greek Title)
 1001 amerikai (Hungarian Title)
 Иљада и една Америка (Macedonian Title)
 克里斯梦游美洲 (Chinese Title)

External links

References 

1980s animated television series
1990s animated television series
Historical television series
1989 Spanish television series debuts
1991 Spanish television series endings
Spanish children's animated adventure television series
1980s Spanish television series
1990s Spanish television series
RTVE shows
Animated television series about children